Paracles fulvicollis is a moth of the subfamily Arctiinae first described by George Hampson in 1905. It is found in Chile. There are several species in the southern temperate region of South America, from Panama to Patagonia.

References

Moths described in 1905
Paracles
Endemic fauna of Chile